Ždírec is a municipality and village in Česká Lípa District in the Liberec Region of the Czech Republic. It has about 100 inhabitants.

Administrative parts
Villages of Bořejov and Ždírecký Důl are administrative parts of Ždírec.

References

Villages in Česká Lípa District